The Feth-i Bülend class was a class of two ironclad warships built for the Ottoman Navy in the 1860s and 1870s. The lead ship, was built in Britain, and served as the basis for the second, which was built in the Ottoman Imperial Arsenal. The design for the ships was based on the earlier , which were also built in Britain. Central battery ships, Feth-i Bülend and Mukaddeme-i Hayir were armed with a battery of four  Armstrong guns in a casemate.

Both ships served during the Russo-Turkish War of 1877–1878, where they operated against Russian forces in the Black Sea. Feth-i Bülend fought a Russian vessel in an inconclusive battle, and both ships supported an amphibious assault on the port of Sokhumi. After the war, both vessels were placed in reserve, and saw no further activity until 1897, when they were mobilized at the start of the Greco-Turkish War. Like the rest of the Ottoman fleet, both ships were in poor condition and were unable to be used offensively. After the war ended, Feth-i Bülend was rebuilt, but Mukaddeme-i Hayir was too badly deteriorated to merit reconstruction. Feth-i Bülend served as a guard ship in Salonika during the First Balkan War, where she was sunk by a Greek torpedo boat in October 1912. Mukaddeme-i Hayir survived, first as a training ship, and then as a barracks ship, until 1923, when she was broken up.

Design
In 1861, Abdülaziz became sultan of the Ottoman Empire, and thereafter began a construction program to strengthen the Ottoman Navy, which had incurred heavy losses during the Crimean War of 1853–1856. He ordered several ironclad warships from shipyards in Britain and France, though the program was limited by the Ottoman Empire's weak finances. The Navy ordered Feth-i Bülend from the Thames Iron Works in 1867. The design for the Feth-i Bülend class was based on the earlier , both of which were built at the same shipyard. A second member of the class, Mukaddeme-i Hayir, was ordered from the Imperial Arsenal in 1868. The rapid pace of naval development in the 1860s and 1870s rendered the design obsolescent by the time they entered service, as gun power increased and more modern armor types were developed to counter the more powerful artillery.

Characteristics

Their hulls was constructed with iron, and displaced  normally and  BOM. They had a crew of 16 officers and 153 enlisted men.

The ships were powered by a single horizontal compound engine which drove one screw propeller. Steam was provided by six coal-fired box boilers that were trunked into a single funnel amidships. The Feth-i Bülend-class ships carried  of coal. A supplementary sailing rig was also fitted.

Feth-i Bülend and Mukaddeme-i Hayir were armed with a battery of four  muzzle-loading Armstrong guns mounted in a central, armored casemate, two guns per side. The guns were positioned so as to allow any two to fire directly ahead, astern, or to either broadside. The casemate had heavy armor protection, with the gun battery protected by 222 mm of iron plating. The hull had a complete armored belt at the waterline, which extended .6 m (2 ft) above the line and 1.2 m (4 ft) below. The above-water portion was 222 mm thick, while the submerged part was 150 mm thick.

Modifications
In 1882, Mukaddeme-i Hayir received a light secondary battery consisting of a pair of  Krupp guns, two  guns, two  guns, and two  gun. Feth-i Bülend received the same battery of guns in 1890, less one of the Nordenfelt guns. Feth-i Bülend received a much more significant reconstruction in 1903–1907 from Ansaldo in Genoa. Her armament was completely replaced with new, quick-firing guns manufactured by Krupp. Four 15 cm SK L/40 guns were mounted in the casemate, and six  guns and six  guns were installed on the upper deck. Her crew was also increased to 220.

Ships

Service history
After she entered service, Feth-i Bülend was sent to Crete to assist in stabilizing the island in the aftermath of the Cretan Revolt of 1866–1869, but the Ottoman fleet, under Hobart Pasha, remained largely inactive during this period. Both ships saw extensive use during the Russo-Turkish War of 1877–1878, where they operated against Russian forces in the Black Sea. They were primarily occupied with bombarding Russian coastal positions in support of the Ottoman army in the Caucasus. They also supported an amphibious assault on the port of Sokhumi in May 1877. On 23 July, Feth-i Bülend engaged the Russian armed steamer Vesta in an inconclusive action that left both vessels lightly damaged before Vesta escaped. By this time, Mukaddeme-i Hayir had been transferred to Sulina at the mouth of the Danube to assist in the defense of the port; in November, she and several other ironclads disrupted a Russian attempt to mine the outer harbor.

After the war, both vessels were laid up in Constantinople. They were modernized slightly in the early 1880s. At the start of the Greco-Turkish War in February 1897, the Ottomans inspected the fleet and found that almost all of the vessels, including both Feth-i Bülend-class ships, to be completely unfit for combat against the Greek Navy. Following the end of the war with Greece, the government decided to begin a naval reconstruction program. Mukaddeme-i Hayir was ultimately not reconstructed, but Feth-i Bülend was rebuilt by Ansaldo in Genoa between 1903 and 1907. Feth-i Bülend served as a guard ship in Salonika during the Italo-Turkish War of 1911–1912 and the First Balkan War of 1912. During the latter conflict, her guns were removed to strengthen the land defenses of the port, and she was sunk there by a Greek torpedo boat on 31 October 1912. From 1911, Mukaddeme-i Hayir was used in secondary roles, first as a training ship and after 1914 as a barracks ship. She was ultimately decommissioned in 1923 and broken up for scrap.

Notes

References